Jessica Marguerite Cleaves (December 10, 1948 – May 2, 2014) was an American singer and songwriter. Cleaves was a lead singer of the Friends of Distinction; Earth, Wind & Fire; Parliament Funkadelic; and Raw Silk.

Early life
Jessica Cleaves was born to Mary Gladys Cleaves (née Wilkerson), a librarian, and Lane C. Cleaves II, a US Postal employee. Cleaves' paternal grandfather, Lane C. Cleaves Sr., was Presiding Bishop over Phillips Temple, CME. Cleaves attended the California Institute of The Arts School of Music and went on to attend The University of California, Los Angeles. One of her classmates was the famed songwriter Skip Scarborough.

Career
The Friends of Distinction was founded by Harry Elston and Floyd Butler, and beside Cleaves, it included Barbara Jean Love (plus Charlene Gibson, who replaced Love during her pregnancy).

During 1971, Cleaves became a member of the band Earth, Wind & Fire. She went on to appear on EWF's 1972 LP Last Days and Time and 1973  album Head to the Sky. Cleaves later moved to Detroit where she joined forces with George Clinton and Parliament-Funkadelic. Cleaves went on to appear on Funkadelic's 1976 album Tales of Kidd Funkadelic and 1979 LP Uncle Jam Wants You. She also sang on Parliament's 1979 album Gloryhallastoopid, 1980 LP Trombipulation and Funkadelic's 1981 album The Electric Spanking of War Babies. Cleaves later appeared on George Clinton's 1983 album Computer Games, his 1986 LP R&B Skeletons in the Closet and the P Funk All Stars' 1995 album Dope Dogs.

Personal life
Cleaves died in Los Angeles, California, aged 65, following complications from a stroke. Her godson, director Armand Araujo, began filming Jessica Cleaves, My Friends of Distinction at the time of her passing.

References

External links 

1948 births
2014 deaths
American women singer-songwriters
American soul singers
American funk singers
Earth, Wind & Fire members
P-Funk members
Musicians from Los Angeles
Singer-songwriters from California